Diego Sebastian Galeano (born 1 February 1992) is a Paraguayan former professional tennis player.

Tennis career
Born in Asunción, Galeano was a top 100 junior and made his Davis Cup debut as a 17-year old in 2009. He represented Paraguay at the 2010 Summer Youth Olympics, where he lost a bronze medal playoff in the doubles.

Galeano played college tennis for Baylor University from 2012 to 2015. He won the USTA/ITA Texas Regional singles championship in 2013 and was a doubles semi-finalist (with Julian Lenz) at the 2015 NCAA Championships.

In 2015 he competed at the Pan American Games in Toronto and won a bronze medal in the mixed doubles, partnering Verónica Cepede Royg. He made it through to the quarter-finals of the singles draw, beating seeded players Marcelo Arévalo and Giovanni Lapentti en route.

Galeano has featured in a total of 13 ties for the Paraguay Davis Cup team, most recently in 2018.

References

External links
 
 
 

1992 births
Living people
Paraguayan male tennis players
Sportspeople from Asunción
Baylor Bears men's tennis players
Tennis players at the 2010 Summer Youth Olympics
Tennis players at the 2011 Pan American Games
Pan American Games medalists in tennis
Pan American Games bronze medalists for Paraguay
Competitors at the 2010 South American Games
South American Games medalists in tennis
South American Games silver medalists for Paraguay
Tennis players at the 2015 Pan American Games
Medalists at the 2015 Pan American Games
21st-century Paraguayan people